The Berkeley Handicap is a Grade III American Thoroughbred horse race for horses age three and older over a distance of one and one sixteenth miles with handicap conditions on the Tapeta, a synthetic racing surface held annually in November at Golden Gate Fields in Berkeley, California. The event offers a purse of US$100,000.

History 

The race was inaugurated on 13 October 1948 as the Berkeley Stakes for two-year-olds that were bred in California over the dirt track. The event was won by Moonrush who was ridden by American Hall of Fame jockey Ralph Neves. Moonrush would win the event again the following year when ii was held in March for three-year-olds as a handicap. Moonrush would later in his career capture the Santa Anita Handicap, one of the most prestigious events in California.

The event in its early days would did not have set scheduled date but would regularly rotate March, May and November with a distance of either 6 furlongs or one mile. The event was for three year olds except in 1957 when the event was run for two-year-olds in split divisions and in 1961 when the event was held as an Invitational race which included older horses. In 1958 and 1964 when the race was restricted to three-year-old-fillies. In 1962 the event was not held.

In 1965 the event was scheduled as an open event for three-year-olds and older over a distance  miles. From 1966 to 1970 the event was held in April and run over a much longer distance of  miles. With the creation of a new turf track at Golden Gate Fields in 1972 the event was scheduled on the grass. The event was held on the turf for 6 years. During this the Argentine-bred import Yvetot won the event twice in 1973 and 1974.

In 1978 the event was moved back to the dirt track and scheduled in February over a mile in distance. 

In 1996 the event was held in December as a two-year-old event.

In 2000 the American Graded Stakes Committee classified the event as Grade III. In 2007 the event's conditions were changed to stakes allowance and the this reflected in the name. During the summer of 2007, Golden Gate Fields installed a polymer synthetic type racing surface and since 2008 the event has been run on this surface. In 2012 the event reverted back to handicap conditions.

The Brazilian-bred Editore became the third horse to win the event twice in 2018.

In 2020 the event was not held for the fourth time due to an outbreak of COVID-19 pandemic in the United States.

Records 

Speed record: 
 miles (synthetic) - 1:40.94 Mugaritz  (2019)
1 mile (dirt) - 1:33.80 Snorter  (2004)
 miles (dirt) - 1:40.94 Desert Boom (2005)

Margin:
 7 lengths -  Sun Master (1986) 
 7 lengths -  Wild Wonder (1998)

Most wins:
 2 - Moonrush (1948, 1949)
 2 - Yvetot (ARG) (1973, 1974)
 2 - Editore (BRZ) (2017, 2018)

Most wins by a jockey:
 6 – Russell Baze (1987, 1995, 1998, 2004, 2013, 2015)

Most wins by a trainer:
 4 – Jerry Hollendorfer (1995, 1996, 2000, 2013)

Most wins by an owner :
 2 – Anita King & Gus Luellwitz  (1948, 1949)
 2 – W. K. Gumpert & Edwin Selesnick  (1973, 1974)
 2 – Halo Farms (1995, 2000)
 2 – Jerry Hollendorfer (1996, 2013)
 2 – Bonne Chance Farm & Stud R D I  (2017, 2018)

Winners

Legend:

 
 
 

Notes:

§ Ran as an entry

ƒ Filly or Mare

† In the 2012 running of the event Positive Response was first past the post but interfered twice in the last 100 yards with Anthony's Cross who had finished fourth and was disqualified. Positive Response was placed fourth and Awesome Gem was declared the official winner of the event.

‡ In 1948 the event was for two-year-olds that were bred in California

See also
 List of American and Canadian Graded races

References

Graded stakes races in the United States
Open mile category horse races
Horse races in California
Sports in the San Francisco Bay Area
Golden Gate Fields
Recurring sporting events established in 1948
1948 establishments in California
Grade 3 stakes races in the United States